Her First Mate is a 1933 American pre-Code comedy film directed by William Wyler and written by Clarence Marks, Earle Snell and H. M. Walker, who adapted it from the play written by Frank Craven, John Golden and Daniel Jarrett. The film stars Slim Summerville, ZaSu Pitts, Una Merkel, Warren Hymer, Berton Churchill and George F. Marion. The film was released on August 3, 1933, by Universal Pictures.

Plot
A peanut and candy butcher on an Albany night boat dreams of owning his own boat.

Cast 
Slim Summerville as John Horner
ZaSu Pitts as Mary Horner
Una Merkel as Hattie
Warren Hymer as Percy
Berton Churchill as Davis
George F. Marion as Sam 
Henry Armetta as Nick Socrates

References

External links 
 

1933 films
American comedy films
1933 comedy films
Universal Pictures films
Films directed by William Wyler
American black-and-white films
1930s English-language films
1930s American films